Wildness of Youth is a 1922 silent film directed by Ivan Abramson, starring Virginia Pearson, Harry T. Morey and Mary Anderson.

Plot
Spoiled son Andrew Kane (Joseph Striker) competes with James Surbrun (Harry T. Morey) for the affections of wild child Julie Grayton (Mary Anderson).  Kane is convicted of murdering Surbrun, but later exonerated.

Cast
Virginia Pearson as Louise Wesley
Harry T. Morey as James Surbrun
Mary Anderson as Julie Grayton
Joseph Striker as Andrew Kane
Thurston Hall as Edward Grayton
Julia Swayne Gordon as Mrs. Martha Kane
Bobby Connelly as Teddy Wesley
Harry Southard as Dr. Carlyle Preston
Madeline La Varre as Señora Gonzalez
George J. Williams as Roger Moore

Reception
Writer Carl Sandburg, who was a regular film critic in the 1920s, reviewed the film critically, writing that "the silly, the trashy, the obvious, the slipshod, the shoddy, it is here. ... It is the type of picture that leads to the comment, 'Movies are made for morons.'"  Other more non-specific reviews were positive (as was typical of the era) calling it a "wonderful production."  Industry-paper Film Daily found that the picture was better than some of Abramson's prior releases, and though "not high class entertainment", predicted it would probably do fairly well at the box office.

Status
It is not known whether the film currently survives.

References

External links

Wildness of Youth at American Film Institute

American silent feature films
American black-and-white films
Films directed by Ivan Abramson
Silent American drama films
1922 drama films
1922 films
1920s American films